Kuya is a multi-platinum award-winning Canadian hip hop, R&B and pop production duo from Toronto, Ontario, consisting of Samuel T. Gerongco and Robert T. Gerongco (both sometimes credited without the "T.").

Early life 

Samuel T. Gerongco (Sammy) and Robert T. Gerongco (Bobby) were born in Toronto, Ontario. They are the sons of Felipe and Godofreda Gerongco, and brothers of America Patman.

Sammy's first big break as an actor/singer and dancer was in the original Canadian production of the Broadway musical Miss Saigon at the Princess of Wales Theatre in Toronto, which then lead to a five-year run on Broadway in New York City. It was there that Sammy met Johann Camat (originally from Montreal) after both being cast in the production. Shortly after that, the group Kuya was formed as soon as Sammy's younger brother Bobby joined after completing his program in music production. After beginning to develop their unique style and recording with producers in Los Angeles, New York City and Toronto, Kuya quickly caught the attention of internationally recognized producers (Wyclef Jean, Pharrell Williams, Timbaland), and record label executives within the North American Music Industry

It was in New York that the brothers put their work as a group on hold to begin developing their craft as songwriters and producers.

Career 

In 2004, Kuya produced on two U.S. Top 10 albums including the No.1 Grammy nominated album Suit for hip hop artist Nelly, as well as Mase's Welcome Back album. Both would do extremely well, with Nelly reaching 3 million in sales worldwide (3× platinum) and Mase hitting gold (500,000 units). Jon Platt from EMI Music Publishing signed Kuya on in 2005.

Kuya Production's official releases include songs by Jesse McCartney, Kandi Burruss, Big Time Rush, Jordin Sparks, Girlicious, and Slim (singer). The year 2009 was devoted to the development and recording of their new R&B artist, JRDN. The next year was known as a breakout year for JRDN, including a top ten single, a number one hit on the Much Music charts, along with two Juno Award nominations. JRDN's second single "Like Magic", produced by Kuya, achieved a SOCAN award for the most played song on Urban Radio across the nation.

In 2011, Kuya was a part of Cover Me Canada, a Canadian reality television show which aired on CBC Television. Kuya came on as producers to work with the Cover Me Canada contestants.

2012-Present 

In January 2012, Vancouver-native Terence (Tee) Lam joined Kuya as a producer and sound engineer.

Kuya's 2013 work included the release of JRDN's second studio album, as well as single releases for pop artist Karina Es. In 2015, Kuya wrote and produced for Canadian R&B singer Alessia Cara's debut album, Know-It-All, including her hit single "Here", which went #1 on the Hot R&B/Hip-Hop Songs, Rhythmic, Mainstream Top 40 and peaked at #5 on the Billboard Hot 100. Other songs they wrote for her debut album "Seventeen", "Overdose", "Stars" and "Outlaws". Cara's first time recording in a studio was with Kuya Productions and Sebastian Kole.

In 2016, Kuya produced on the song "F.U." on the #1 selling album Glory Days for girl group Little Mix. The album debuted at number one on the UK Albums Chart; it later became their first album to yield more than two top ten singles when the fourth single, "Power", reached number six on the UK Singles Chart. In January 2018 the album was certified triple platinum in the UK for shipments of 900,000 units.[2]

AS their career moved forward, Kuya has worked with an international artists including Christina Aguilera, Kelly Clarkson, Delta Goodrem, Marco McKinnis, Katie Kim and CNCO.

In 2019, singles Kuya produced for Meghan Trainor and Kaskade hit the US top 40, while the EP Que Quienes Somos, produced for CNCO, debuted at #1 on the Latin Pop Albums charts. Que Quienes Somos included the Kuya penned song "De Mi". Duncan Laurence, who performed the Eurovision Song Contest 2019-winning song earlier in the year, released his single "Love Don't Hate It", co-written by Kuya.

2020-Present 

2020 Kuya produces, with Lido, "U Should" for Chika. Kuya produces and writes "Ghosted" for Benicio Bryant. Kuya writes "Happy" for Taeyeon.

Discography

References

External links 
 
 
  
 
 
 
 

Year of birth missing (living people)
Living people
Canadian record producers